Pseudoluperus maculicollis is a species of leaf beetles in the family Chrysomelidae. It is found in Central America and North America.

References

 Riley, Edward G., Shawn M. Clark, and Terry N. Seeno (2003). "Catalog of the leaf beetles of America north of Mexico (Coleoptera: Megalopodidae, Orsodacnidae and Chrysomelidae, excluding Bruchinae)". Coleopterists Society Special Publication no. 1, 290.

Galerucinae
Beetles described in 1884
Taxa named by John Lawrence LeConte